Jim Cox may refer to:

Jim Cox (guard) (1920–2014), American football player
Jim Cox (tight end) (born 1946), American football player
Jim Cox (Australian politician) (born 1945), Tasmanian Labor politician and member of the Tasmanian House of Assembly
Jim Cox (baseball) (born 1950), American Major League Baseball second baseman
Jim Cox (historian), historian on the subject of radio programming
Jim Cox (American politician) (born 1969), Pennsylvania state representative

See also
James Cox (disambiguation)